Fausto David Ruiz Villalobos (born April 25, 1985, in San Luis Potosí, Mexico) is a Mexican former footballer who last played for C.F. Mérida of the Liga de Ascenso in Mexico.

Teams
  Petroleros de Salamanca 2006-2009
  Atlante UTN 2009-2010
  San Luis Potosí 2010
  Deportes Puerto Montt 2011
  Dorados de Sinaloa 2012
  Lobos de la BUAP 2013
  C.F. Mérida 2013–2014

External links
 
 
 

1985 births
Living people
Mexican expatriate footballers
Association football forwards
Salamanca F.C. footballers
Toros Neza footballers
San Luis F.C. players
Puerto Montt footballers
Dorados de Sinaloa footballers
Lobos BUAP footballers
C.F. Mérida footballers
Murciélagos FC footballers
Liga MX players
Ascenso MX players
Primera B de Chile players
Mexican expatriate sportspeople in Chile
Expatriate footballers in Chile
Footballers from San Luis Potosí
People from San Luis Potosí City
Mexican footballers